Kasan (also Romanized as Kāsān; also known as Kaskan) is a village in Molla Sara Rural District, in the Central District of Shaft County, Gilan Province, Iran. At the 2006 census, its population was 696, in 184 families.

References 

Populated places in Shaft County